Telmatobius fronteriensis is a species of frog in the family Telmatobiidae.
It is found in Chile and possibly Bolivia.
Its natural habitats are rivers, freshwater marshes, geothermal wetlands, and ponds.

References

fronteriensis
Amphibians of the Andes
Amphibians of Chile
Endemic fauna of Chile
Taxonomy articles created by Polbot
Amphibians described in 2002